Anna (also Romanized as ‘Annā, ‘Anā’, and Anā) is a village in Babuyi Rural District, Basht District, Basht County, Kohgiluyeh and Boyer-Ahmad Province, Iran. At the 2006 census, its population was 25, in 10 families.

References 

Populated places in Basht County